"Piece of Me" is a song recorded by American deep house DJ Marc Kinchen and British singer Becky Hill. The song was released as a digital download on 27 February 2016 through Sony Music. The song peaked to number 37 on the UK Singles Chart. The song was written by Marc Kinchen, Mary Leay, Rebecca Hill and Timothy Martin Powell.

Music video
A music video to accompany the release of "Piece of Me" was first released onto YouTube on 15 April 2016 at a total length of two minutes and fifty-one seconds.

Chart performance

Weekly charts

Certifications

Release history

References

2016 singles
2016 songs
MK (DJ) songs
Becky Hill songs
Sony Music singles
Songs written by Marc Kinchen
Songs written by Tim Powell (producer)
Songs written by Becky Hill